Chris Eckert (born February 22, 1986) is an American actor, comedian and writer who is a current main company member of The Groundlings, and has appearances in shows such as Raising Hope, Super Fun Night, The Comeback, and Mad TV.

Life and career
Chris Eckert was born in Oakland, California. He attended Hayward High School and graduated in 2004. He is a member of The Groundlings, an improv and sketch comedy troupe based in Los Angeles. In 2015, Chris starred in a campaign for Fiat and NBCUniversal opposite Bobby Moynihan. Chris is the grandson of decorated British officer Sandy Smith.

Television

References

External links 
 

1986 births
Male actors from California
Living people
American gay actors
American male comedians
American male television actors
People from Hayward, California
21st-century LGBT people